Park Ji Hye (born July 21, 1986), better known by her stage name Zia, is a South Korean singer.

History

Pre-debut
Zia's first foray into the music industry was when she participated in the 2003 'BoA-jjang Contest' where she placed first overall. In 2005, she was featured on KCM's song '물론' for his second album. Later on that year, she released a song for the soundtrack of the Korean movie, Shadowless Sword.

2007–2008: Debut
Zia released her debut album Voice of Heaven through the agency Taewon Entertainment in July 2007. Her leading single was the ballad 물끄러미, which was greeted with great success. Her follow-up singles included 내마음별과같이 (Feat. KCM) and 수호천사. In November, she was featured in the compilation album titled Violin. Other well known artists featured on the album included Seeya, KCM, and Song SeungHeon.

In the beginning of 2008, she was asked to participate in Cho Young Soo's All Star album series. SG Wannabe were also featured on the album. Her second full album, Road Movie was released in July, and was again met with much critical acclaim. The leading single for the album was titled 'I Love You, I'm Sorry' and the music video featured actor Shin Hyun Jun. He also participated in the music videos for the album's other two singles, 난 행복해 and 뭉클.

2009–2010: Transfer to LOEN
After releasing her mini album titled Orchestra, Zia left her agency and was signed to LOEN Entertainment. She released a digital single and another mini album in December, with the first single, 'Have a Drink', being banned for those under the age of 19 because of reference to alcohol consumption. Despite the ban, the song was still met with much success.

Zia started 2010 by releasing another digital single, titled 'Bad Habit'. She began going out and promoting again with the release of the mini album Difference, with the music video of the lead single, 'Just Laugh', including the actor Shin Hak Yun. After the success of 'Just Laugh', she finished up the year by releasing a collaborative single with the ballad group 4men and another mini album.

2011–present: Other activities and further releases
After participating in the soundtracks for the popular TV shows Listen to My Heart and Can't Lose, Zia prepared for the release of her second full album, Avancer. The song 'Hope it's With You' was released as a digital single before the album's release as a hype song. After finishing up promotions for the album, she released a digital single that was a response to her previous song, 'Have a Drink'.

Zia spent most of 2012 out of the spotlight, with her only activities being a song for the Dr. Jin soundtrack and a collaboration with fellow ballad singer Huh Gak. Their single, 'I Need You' managed to secure a number one spot despite lack of promotions. She also participated in her label's artist album Loen Tree Summer Story. Her track was a duet with label mates Sunny Hill.

Discography

Studio albums

Extended plays

Singles

Awards

2008 – 15th Republic of Korea Entertainment Arts Awards (Best Ballad Singer)

2013 – 4th Gaon Chart K-Pop Awards –  Artist of the Year (Digital Music): ZiA – Loved You (With Seo in Guk)

2015 – 21st Republic of Korea Entertainment Arts Awards (Best Ballad Singer)

External links
 Official website

References

1986 births
Living people
Artists from Seoul
South Korean women pop singers
K-pop singers
South Korean female idols
Kakao M artists
21st-century South Korean singers
21st-century South Korean women singers